Hatherton may refer to:

 Hatherton, Cheshire, England
 Hatherton, Staffordshire, England
 The derelict Hatherton Canal
 Baron Hatherton
 Hatherton Glacier, in East Antarctica, named for Trevor Hatherton